VNO may mean:

 The IATA airport code for Vilnius International Airport
 Virtual Network Operator, a network service provider that does not own telecoms infrastructure
 VNO speed, the maximum safe cruise speed of an aircraft
 Vomeronasal organ, an auxiliary olfactory sense organ in some tetrapods
 The stock symbol for Vornado Realty Trust, a real estate investment trust